Suflu (also Romanized as Şūflū; also known as Sofoly) is a village in Zarjabad Rural District, Firuz District, Kowsar County, Ardabil Province, Iran. At the 2006 census, its population was 259, in 58 families.

References 

Tageo

Towns and villages in Kowsar County